Marshall Fixman (September 21, 1930 - February 27, 2016) was an American physical chemist, University Distinguished Professor Emeritus at Colorado State University, and a member of the U.S. National Academy of Sciences.

Fixman earned his undergraduate degree in 1950 from Washington University in St. Louis, and his Ph.D. from the Massachusetts Institute of Technology in 1954. 

Fixman was elected a Fellow of the American Physical Society in 1962 while working at the University of Oregon. For his research—theoretical and computational studies of the physical chemistry of polymers—Fixman was elected to the National Academy of Sciences in 1973.

Fixman held an endowed professorship at Yale University but moved to Colorado State in 1979 with his wife, Branka Ladanyi, who also joined CSU's chemistry faculty. He was an associate editor of the Journal of Chemical Physics, and received the American Chemical Society's awards in pure chemistry (1964) and polymer chemistry (1991).

References

External links
 Faculty Web Page at Colorado State University
 Jeffrey Kovac, "Marshall Fixman", Biographical Memoirs of the National Academy of Sciences (2018)

1930 births
2016 deaths
American physical chemists
Fellows of the American Physical Society
Members of the United States National Academy of Sciences
Washington University in St. Louis alumni
Computational chemists
Chemists from Missouri